Joana Vicente is a Portuguese independent movie producer and executive. A prominent figure in the New York film industry, Vicente has produced over forty films with her producing partner and husband Jason Kliot. In 1999 Vicente and Kliot produced Tony Bui's feature debut, Three Seasons, which took the three top awards at the Sundance Film Festival, including the Audience Award and the Grand Jury Prize. Vicente and Kliot have since worked with directors such as Steven Soderbergh, Brian De Palma, Hal Hartley, Nicole Holofcener, Jim Jarmusch, and Alex Gibney.

Vicente graduated from the Catholic University of Portugal with a Licenciatura degree in Philosophy. She began her career as the press attaché for the Portuguese delegate (and former Prime Minister of Portugal) at the European Parliament, and then as a radio news producer for the United Nations.

From December 2009 to August 2018, Vicente served as the Executive Director of Independent Filmmaker Project, the nation's oldest and largest organization of independent filmmakers. Under Vicente's leadership, the Independent Filmmaker Project was bestowed with the honor of developing and operating the Made in NY Media Center after an request for proposals was issued by the New York City Mayor's Office of Media and Entertainment and the New York City Economic Development Corporation. Opened in Dumbo, Brooklyn in October 2013, facilities include an incubator and community workspace co-working spaces, a library, offices for anchor tenants, classrooms designed to host a wide array of educational programs such as hands-on workshops, live demonstrations and expert seminars, a media arts gallery showcasing cutting-edge, new-media storytelling installations from artists within the international art and filmmaking community, a 72-seat screening room for exhibiting and sharing the latest work from the center and around the world, and the 1,600-square-foot café Cuper for casual collaboration and discussion in a social-eating setting. The state-of-the-art media center aims to bring together professionals from the film, television, advertising, new media, gaming, marketing and branding industries for collaboration and new opportunities.

In 2013, Vicente was named to Variety's Women's Impact List and Marie Claire's New Guard power list. She also served on the World Cinema Jury for the 2013 Sundance Film Festival. In 2014, she was named one of the Brooklyn Magazine's 100 Most Influential People in Brooklyn Culture. In April of that year, Vicente gave a talk at the TedxLIU conference "The Innovator Within: Redefining Entrepreneurship" entitled "Keep Walking: How to achieve your goals or Crossing the Street in Saigon: A Metaphor for the Young Entrepreneur".

In 2018, Vicente succeeded Piers Handling as executive director of the Toronto International Film Festival. Following the 2021 Toronto International Film Festival, she stepped down from that role to take a job as CEO of the Sundance Institute.

Open City Films

Vicente and Kliot are co-founders and presidents of Open City Films, a production company of feature films and documentaries with an acclaimed catalog of films including Three Seasons, Enron: The Smartest Guys in the Room, Coffee and Cigarettes, Redacted, The Assassination of Richard Nixon, Welcome to the Dollhouse and Awake. Throughout the years, their films have been nominated for 23 Independent Spirit Awards- four have won. Their films have also been selected numerous times for the Cannes, Berlin, Venice, and Toronto film festivals and have garnered four winning trophies at The Sundance Film Festival.

Blow Up Pictures

In 1998, Vicente and Kliot founded Blow Up Pictures, the first digital production company in the United States. Their first film, Chuck & Buck, was the first digital film produced and distributed in the US. It premiered at the Sundance Film Festival and was nominated for five Independent Spirit Awards in 2001. Under the Blow Up banner, Vicente and Kliot also produced such films as Lovely and Amazing, Series 7: The Contenders, and Love in the Time of Money.

HDNet Films

In 2003, Vicente and Kliot co-founded HDNet Films with Mark Cuban and Todd Wagner.  The company produced 18 films in five years, all shot on digital video. The HDNet Films production of Steven Soderbergh's  Bubble  was the first film ever to be released "day-and-date," in the United States, simultaneously opening across theatrical, cable and satellite television,  and home video platforms. This innovative distribution strategy allowed consumers to choose how, when and where they wished to see a film.

Films produced under HDNet include Academy-Award nominated Enron: The Smartest Guys in the Room, and Redacted, which took the Silver Lion at the 2007 Venice Film Festival.

Boards and institutions

Jerusalem International Film Lab Advisory Board 
Feirstein Graduate School of Cinema Advisory board
Creative future-  Leadership Committee
World Portuguese Network (Conselho da Diáspora Portuguesa)

Filmography as producer/executive producer
 Games & Private Life (1991)
 Touch Base (1994)
 Welcome to the Dollhouse (1995)
 Blixa Bargeld Stole My Cowboy Boots (1996)
 Alkali, Iowa (1996)
 Black Kites (1996)
 Souvenir (1996)
 Too Much Sleep (1997)
 Strawberry Fields (1997)
 Childhood's End (1997)
 Chocolate Babies (1997)
 A, B, C…Manhattan (1997)
 O.K. Garage (1998)
 Taxman (1999)
 Three Seasons (1999)
 Return to Paradise Lost (1999)
 Chuck and Buck (2000)
 Down to You (2000)
 Series 7: The Contenders (2001)
 Little Senegal (2001)
 Love the Hard Way (2001)
 Lovely & Amazing (2001)
 Love in the Time of Money (2002)
 Never Get Outta the Boat (2002)
 The Guys (2002)
 Coffee and Cigarettes (2003)
 The Best Thief in the World (2004)
 The Pornographer: A Love Story (2004)
 The Assassination of Richard Nixon (2004)
 Enron: The Smartest Guys in the Room (2005)
 Bubble (2005)
 One Last Thing... (2005)
 The War Within (2005)
 S&Man (2006)
 Herbie Hancock: Possibilities (2006)
 The Architect (2006)
 Diggers (2006)
 Fay Grim (2006)
 Broken English (2007)
 Redacted (2007)
 Surfwise (2007)
 Mr. Untouchable (2007)
 Awake (2007)
 Quid Pro Quo (2008)
 Gonzo: The Life and Work of Dr. Hunter S. Thompson (2008)
 American Swing (2008)
 Staten Island (2009)
 Capernaum (2018)

Awards, nominations, and juries 
2000 Independent Spirit Award nomination, Best First Feature for Three Seasons
 2006 Academy-Award nomination, Best Feature Length Documentary for Enron: The Smartest Guys in the Room
 2007 Made in NY Award, conferred by Mayor Michael Bloomberg and the New York Office of Film, Television, and Broadcasting
 2008 Venice International Film Festival Short Film Competition Jury Member
 2010 Jacksonville Film Festival Excellence in Producing Award
 2010 Jacksonville Film Festival Women In Film honouree
 2010 Nantucket Film Festival Tony Cox Screenwriting Award Jury Member
 2011 Jerusalem Film Festival Pitch Point Jury Member
 2013 Sundance Film Festival World Cinema Jury Member

References

External links
 

American film producers
American women film producers
Living people
Catholic University of Portugal alumni
Portuguese emigrants to the United States
Portuguese film producers
Portuguese women film producers
Toronto International Film Festival people
Year of birth missing (living people)
Film festival directors